Assamese literature is the entire corpus of poetry, novels, short stories, plays, documents and other writings in the Assamese language. It also includes the literary works in the older forms of the language during its evolution to the contemporary form and its cultural heritage and tradition. The literary heritage of the Assamese language can be traced back to the c. 9-10th century in the Charyapada, where the earliest elements of the language can be discerned.

Banikanta Kakati divides the history of Assamese literature into three prominent eras—Early Assamese, Middle Assamese and Modern Assamese—which is generally accepted.

Ancient era: Literature of the beginning period, 950-1300 AD 

 Charyapada
 Mantra Sahitya

Medieval era: 1300-1826 AD 

 1st period: Pre-Shankari literature, 1300-1490 AD
 2nd period: Shankari literature, 1490-1700 AD
 3rd period: Post-Shankari literature, 1700-1826 AD

Modern era: 1826 AD-present 

 1st period: Missionary literature, 1826-1870 AD
 2nd period: Hemchandra-Gunabhiram Barua's era, 1870-1890 AD
 3rd period: Romantic era or Bezbaruah's era, 1890-1940 AD
 4th period: Current period, 1940 AD-PRESENT

History

Old Assamese 

The first reference to the language of Assam was found in the account of famous Chinese monk-cum-traveler Xuanzang. He visited the Kamarupa Kingdom during the reign of Kumar Bhaskara Varman of Varman dynasty. While visiting Kamrupa in seventh century, Xuanzang noted that the language of the region was slightly different from the language of Middle India (Magadha). He was able to identify the phonetic differences evident in the region. Even though systematic errors in the Sanskrit of Kamarupa inscriptions portray an underlying Pakrit in the pre-12th century period, scarce examples of the language exist.  The Charyapadas, the Buddhist ballads of 8th-10th century some of whose composers were from Kamarupa and the language of which bear strong affinities with Assamese (besides Bengali, Maithili and Oriya), are considered the first examples of Assamese literature.  The spirit of the Charyapadas are found in later-day Deh-Bicaror Geet and other aphorisms; and some of the ragas found their way to the 15th-16th century Borgeets. In the 12th-14th century period the works of Ramai Pundit (Sunya Puran), Boru Chandidas (Krishna Kirtan), Sukur Mamud (Gopichandrar Gan), Durllava Mullik (Gobindachandrar Git) and Bhavani Das (Mainamatir Gan) bear strong grammatical relationship to Assamese; and their expressions and their use of adi-rasa are found in the later Panchali works of Mankar and Pitambar.  These works are claimed as examples of Bengali literature as well. After this period of shared legacy, a fully differentiated Assamese literature finally emerged in the 14th century.

Medieval era

Pre-Shankari literature (1300-1490 AD) 
This period saw the flourishing of two kinds of literary activity: translations and adaptations, and choral songs.

Translations and adaptations
The earliest known Assamese writer of this period was Hema Saraswati, whose well known works include Prahlad Charita and Hara Gauri Samvada. The story of the Prahlad Charita is taken from the Vamana Purana and the Hara Gouri Samvada includes the myth of Hara-Gouri marriage, birth of Kartik etc. Kaviratna Saravati's Jayadratha-vadha; Rudra Kandali's Satyaki-pravesa are prominent works of this era. Harivara Vipra, a court poet of Kamata Kingdom, composed Vavruvahanar Yuddha (based on the Mahabharata), Lava-Kushar Yuddha (based on the Ramayana) and Tamradwajar Yudha. Though translated works, they contain local descriptions and embellishments, a feature that describes all translated work of this period. His Vavruvahanar Yuddha, for instance makes references to articles of the Ahom kingdom, which at that time was a small kingdom in the east, and describes the undivided Lakhimpur region, and in Lava-Kushar Yuddha he departs from the original and describes local customs for Rama and Sita's pumsavana ceremony.  All these works are associated with Durlabhanarayan of Kamata and his immediate successors.The major work from this period that left a lasting impression is Saptakanda Ramayana, composed by Madhava Kandali in verse, and recited in the court of a 14th-century Baraha king Mahamanikya (Mahamanikpha) who ruled either in the Nagaon or the Golaghat region.  In chronology, among vernacular translations of the original Sanskrit, Kandali's Ramayana comes after Kamban's (Tamil, 12th century), and ahead of Kirttivas' (Bengali, 15th century), Tulsidas' (Awadhi, 16th century), Balaram Das' (Oriya) etc. Thus the Saptakanda Ramayana becomes the first rendition of the Ramayana into an Indo-Aryan language in the Indian subcontinent. The literary language (as opposed to the colloquial Assamese) this work adopted became the standard literary language for much of the following periods, till the rise of new literature in the 19th century. That his work was a major influence can be inferred from Sankardeva's tribute to the "Opromadi Kobi/ অপ্ৰমাদী কবি" ("unerring predecessor poet").
The pada form of metrical verse (14 syllables in each verse with identical two syllables at the end of each foot in a couplet) became a standard in Assamese kavya works, something that continued till the modern times.  Though a translated work, it is infused with local color, and instead of the heroic, Kandali instead emphasized the homely issues of relationships etc. Among the two kinds of alamkara's, arthalankaras were used extensively, with similes and metaphors taken from the local milieu even though the original works are set in foreign lands; whereas the shabdalankara (alliteration etc.) were rarely used.

In the pre-shankari era, a renowned mathematician, Bakul Kayastha from Kamarupa Kingdom, compiled Kitabat Manjari(1434), which was a translation of the Līlāvatī by Bhāskara II into Assamese. Kitabat Manjari is a poetical treatise on Arithmetic, Surveying and Bookkeeping. The book teaches how accounts are to be kept under different heads and how stores belonging to the royal treasury are to be classified and entered into a stock book. The works of Bakul Kayastha were regarded as standards in his time to be followed by other Kayasthas in maintaining royal accounts.

Choral songs 
Choral songs composed for a popular form of narration-performances called Oja-Pali, a precursor to theater and theatrical performances, came to be known as Panchali works. Though some of these works are contemporaneous to Sankardeva's, they hark back to older forms free of Sankardeva's influences and so are considered pre-Sankardeva literature.  The Oja-palis follow two different traditions: biyah-gowa which tells stories from the Mahabharata and Maroi, which tells stories on the snake goddess Manasa. The poets—Pitambar, Durgabar, Mankar and Sukavi Narayan—are well known for the compositions.

Shankari literature (1490-1700 AD) 

In Assamese literature, the era of Shankardeva or Shankari era, incorporates the literary works that were produced mostly as pertinent to the Neo-Vaishnavite movement which propagated the Ekasarana Nama-Dharma. Sankardeva’s contribution to Assamese literature is multidimensional and spread through different genres of literature. He is credited with building on past cultural relics and devising new forms of music (Borgeet), theatrical performance (Ankia Naat, Bhaona), dance (Sattriya), literary language (Brajavali). Sankardev produced a large body of work. Though there were others before him who wrote in the language of the common man, it was Sankardev who opened the floodgates and inspired others like Madhavdev to carry on where he left off. His magnum opus is the Kirtana-Ghosha which contains narrative verses glorifying Shri krishna, meant for community singing. His other prominent literary works include the rendering of eight books of the Bhagavata Purana including the Adi Dasama (Book X), Harishchandra-upakhyana, Bhakti-pradip, Nimi-navasiddha-samvada, Bhakti-ratnakara (Sanskrit verses, mostly from the Bhagavata, compiled into a book), Anadi-patana, Gunamala and many plays like Cihna Yatra, Rukmini haran, Patni prasad, Keli gopal, Kurukshetra yatra and Srirama vijaya.

Madhavdeva, a disciple of Sankardeva, has a large scale contribution to Assamese literature. His Magnum opus, Naam Ghosa is based chiefly on the Bhagavata Purana. The Naam-Ghosa is known by the name of Hajari Ghosa as well, as it contains one thousand verses (ghosas).His Guru Bhatima, a long poem of praise to his Guru Sankardev, is also popular. Bhakti-Ratnavali is another notable work, rendered by Madhavadeva from the original work by Visnupuri in Sanskrit. Other prominent works include Naam Maalikaa, Assamese rendering of the Adi Kanda of Valmiki's Ramayana, Janma Rahasya, 191 Borgeets and several plays.

After Sankardev and Madhavdev, several other writers emerged and contributed to Assamese literature. Ananta Kandali's Mahiravana Vadha, Harihara Yuddha, Vrttrasura Vadha, Kumara Harana and Sahasra Nama Vrttanta; Rama Saraswati's translation of the Mahabharata, Geeta Govinda and Vadha Kavyas; a part of Naam Ghosa by Ratnakar Kandali; Sridhar Kandali's Kumara Harana; Janmajatra, Nandutsav, Gopi-Uddhab Sambad and Sitar Patal Pravesh by Gopaldev; compilation of Kirtan Ghosha by Ramcharan Thakur; Nava Ghosha, Santasaar, Burha-Bhashya by Purushottam Thakur etc. are notable of the period.

Bhattadeva, another notable writer of this period, is acknowledged as the father of Assamese prose. Katha Bhagavata, Katha Gita, Bhaktiratnavali, Bhakti Viveka (Sanskrit) etc. are his prominent works. BhattadevBhattadeva's erudition in Sanskrit grammar and literature, and his command over the Bhagavata earned him the title of Bhagavata Bhattacharya.

Post-Shankari literature (1700-1826 AD) 
Along with the expansion of power and border of the Ahom kingdom, literary works other than Neo-vaishnavite centric started gaining momentum in the 18th century. However the tradition of composing works based on Sanskrit scriptures still continued. Raghunath Mahanta was one of the most important figures of this period whose well known works include Katha-Ramayana, Adbhut Ramayana and Satrunjoy- all of them are based on the Ramayana. Kabiraj Chakravarti's translation of Brahma Vaivarta Purana and Shakuntala, Gitar Puthi of Kabiraj Chakravati mentions several songs themselves composed by the Ahom Rajas Rudra Singha and Siva Singha. Kavichandra Dwija's Dharma Purana, Bishnu Dev Goswami's Padma Purana, Putala Charitra by Borruchi, Ramchadra Borpatra's Hoigrib-Madhva Kahini, Acharya Dwija's Ananda-Lahari, Ruchinath Kandali's translation of Chandi Aakhyana are important works of this period. Among translation of texts related to practical knowledge include translation of Srihastha Muktavali on Dance and mudra by Suchand Ojha, translations of Kaamratna- Tantra, Bhaswati by Kaviraj Chakraborti. Hastividyarnava, commissioned under the patronage of king Siva Singha and translated by Sukumar Barkaith, is based on the Sanskrit text Gajendra-Chintamoni by Sambhunath. Books like Ghora Nidaan, Aswanidaan by Surjyakhari Daivajna were also compiled during this period.

Attached to the palace of the Ahom Kings there was a set of apartments for the preservation of royal manuscripts, records, letters despatches, and maps in charge of a high official named Gandbia Barua. There was another officer named Likhakar Barua literally the superintendent of scribes who supervised the work of an army of clerks and copyists.

Modern era

This is a period of the prose chronicles (Buranji) of the Ahom court. The Ahoms had brought with them an instinct for historical writings. In the Ahom court, historical chronicles were at first composed in their original Tai-Kadai language, but when the Ahom rulers adopted Assamese as the court language, historical chronicles began to be written in Assamese. From the beginning of the 17th century onwards, court chronicles were written in large numbers. These chronicles or buranjis, as they were called by the Ahoms, broke away from the style of the religious writers. The language is essentially modern except for slight alterations in grammar and spelling.

Effect of British rule 
The British imposed Bengali in 1836 in Assam after the state was occupied and annexed with the Bengal Presidency. As a result of this language imposition, the progress of education in Assam remained not only slow but highly defected and a lot of Bengalis were imported and employed in the different schools of Assam. Writing of text books in Assamese for school children did not get any encouragement and Assamese literature naturally suffered in its growth. Due to a sustained campaign, Assamese was reinstated in 1873 as the state language. Since the initial printing and literary activity occurred in eastern Assam, the Eastern dialect was introduced in schools, courts, and offices and soon came to be formally recognized as the Standard Assamese. In recent times, with the growth of Guwahati as the political and commercial center of Assam, the Standard Assamese has moved away from its roots in the Eastern dialect.

Influence of missionaries 
The modern Assamese period began with the publication of the Bible in Assamese prose by the American Baptist missionaries in 1819. The currently prevalent standard Asamiya has its roots in the Sibsagar dialect of Eastern Assam. As mentioned in Bani Kanta Kakati's "Assamese, its Formation and Development" (1941, Published by Sree Khagendra Narayan Dutta Baruah, LBS Publications, G.N. Bordoloi Road, Gauhati-1, Assam, India) – "The Missionaries made Sibsagar in Eastern Assam the centre of their activities and used the dialect of Sibsagar for their literary purposes". The American Baptist Missionaries were the first to use this dialect in translating the Bible in 1813.

The missionaries established the first printing press in Sibsagar in 1836 and started using the local Asamiya dialect for writing purposes. In 1846 they started a monthly periodical called Arunodoi, and in 1848, Nathan Brown published the first book on Assamese grammar. The Missionaries published the first Assamese-English Dictionary compiled by M. Bronson in 1867. 
One of the major contributions of the American Baptist missionaries to the Assamese language is the reintroduction of Assamese as the official language in Assam. In 1848 missionary Nathan Brown published a treatise on the Assamese language. This treatise gave a strong impetus towards reintroducing Assamese the official language in Assam. In his 1853 official report on the province of Assam, British official Moffat Mills wrote:

Beginning of modern literature 

The period of modern literature began with the publication the Assamese journal Jonaki (জোনাকী) (1889), which introduced the short story form first by Lakshminath Bezbaroa.  Thus began the Jonaki period of Assamese literature. In 1894 Rajanikanta Bordoloi published the first Assamese novel Mirijiyori.

The modern Assamese literature has been enriched by the works of Jyoti Prasad Agarwalla, Birinchi Kumar Barua, Hem Barua, Atul Chandra Hazarika, Mafizuddin Ahmed Hazarika, Nalini Bala Devi, Navakanta Barua, Syed Abdul Malik, Mamoni Raisom Goswami, Bhabendra Nath Saikia, Homen Borgohain, Birendra Kumar Bhattacharya, D. K. Barooah, Nirupama Borgohain, Kanchan Baruah, Saurabh Kumar Chaliha and others. Moreover, as regards the spreading of Assamese literature outside Assam, the complete work of Jyoti Prasad Agarwala has been translated into Hindi to reach a wider audience by Devi Prasad Bagrodia. Bagrodia has also translated Shrimanta Shankardev's 'Gunamala' into Hindi.

In 1917 the Asam Sahitya Sabha was formed as a guardian of the Assamese society and the forum for the development of Assamese language and literature. Padmanath Gohain Baruah was the first president of the society.

Contemporary literature 

Contemporary writers include Arupa Patangia Kalita, Parismita Singh, Monikuntala Bhattacharya, Mousumi Kondoli, Monalisa Saikia, Geetali Borah, Juri Borah Borgohain. Emerging trends are marked by experiments with post modernist literary technique and growing fascination of young writers with magic realism and surrealism. In the realm of literary criticism young literary critics Areendom Borkataki, Bhaskar Jyoti Nath, Debabhusan Borah are exploring different possibilities and ideas to meet the needs in literary criticism. Assamese literature is currently booming in Assamese-speaking world, with readership of Assamese books gradually increasing over the last decades. A huge success can be seen in North East book fair and Nagaon book fair, when selling of Assamese books increased then English books.

See also 
 List of Assamese writers with their pen names
 Oxomiya Bhaxa Unnati Xadhini Xobha
 Assamese Short Story
 Assamese Poetry
 List of Assamese poets
 Indian literature
 List of Sahitya Akademi Award winners for Assamese
Assam Sahitya Sabha
Sadou Asom Lekhika Samaroh Samiti

Notes

References

External links 
Life and Works of Bhattadeva, the Father of Assamese Prose
Assamese proverbs, published 1896

 
Assamese language
Assamese fiction
Assamese novels
Assamese short story collections
Assamese-language books
Assamese-language culture
Assamese-language works
Assamese-language poets
Assamese-language writers
Literature by language
Indian literature by language